Derryck Andre Thornton Jr. (born May 30, 1997) is an American professional basketball player for the Leicester Riders of the British Basketball league. He played college basketball for the Duke Blue Devils, the USC Trojans, and the Boston College Eagles.

High school career
After attending Sierra Canyon School in Chatsworth, Los Angeles as a freshman, Thornton transferred to Findlay Prep in Henderson, Nevada. As a junior, he averaged 17 points and 6.2 assists per game, leading his team to a 29–3 record. He graduated one year early by taking courses online and at a local junior college.

Recruiting
On April 21, 2015, Thornton committed to play college basketball for Duke over offers from Arizona, Kentucky and Louisville. Coach Mike Krzyzewski convinced him to reclassify to the 2015 class to replace point guard Tyus Jones, who was leaving to play professionally. Thornton was a consensus five-star recruit and one of the highest ranked point guards in his class.

College career
As a freshman at Duke, Thornton made 20 starts but saw his playing time fluctuate despite being the only pure point guard on the team. He averaged 7.1 points and 2.5 assists per game. Following the season Thornton transferred to USC, choosing the Trojans over Kansas, Washington and Miami. After sitting out a season as a redshirt, he averaged 3.8 points and 1.2 assists per game off the bench. As a redshirt junior, Thornton started 27 games and averaged 7.7 points and 4.3 assists per game. He opted to transfer after the season as a graduate transfer and committed to Boston College after considering Gonzaga, Texas Tech, Auburn and St. John's. Thornton averaged 12.7 points, 2.8 rebounds, 3.4 assists and 1.1 steals per game in his final season at Boston College.

Professional career
On August 27, 2020, Thornton signed his first professional contract with Borac Čačak of the Basketball League of Serbia. He averaged 4.9 points and 1.5 assists per game. On December 17, 2021, Thornton signed with the Kapfenberg Bulls of the Austrian Basketball Superliga.

Career statistics

College

|-
| style="text-align:left;"| 2015–16
| style="text-align:left;"| Duke
| 36 || 20 || 26.0 || .390 || .325 || .690 || 1.8 || 2.5 || .8 || .2 || 7.1
|-
| style="text-align:left;"| 2016–17
| style="text-align:left;"| USC
| style="text-align:center;" colspan="11"|  Redshirt
|-
| style="text-align:left;"| 2017–18
| style="text-align:left;"| USC
| 25 || 1 || 14.2 || .363 || .318 || .852 || 1.4 || 1.2 || .7 || .2 || 3.8
|-
| style="text-align:left;"| 2018–19
| style="text-align:left;"| USC
| 32 || 27 || 27.7 || .382 || .286 || .660 || 2.8 || 4.3 || 1.2 || .1 || 7.7
|-
| style="text-align:left;"| 2019–20
| style="text-align:left;"| Boston College
| 29 || 29 || 31.4 || .376 || .263 || .786 || 2.8 || 3.4 || 1.1 || .2 || 12.7
|- class="sortbottom"
| style="text-align:center;" colspan="2"| Career
| 122 || 77 || 25.3 || .380 || .290 || .744 || 2.2 || 2.9 || 1.0 || .2 || 7.9

References

External links
Boston College Eagles bio
USC Trojans bio
Duke Blue Devils bio
USA Basketball bio

1997 births
Living people
ABA League players
African-American baseball players
American expatriate basketball people in Serbia
American men's basketball players
Basketball people from California
Boston College Eagles men's basketball players
Duke Blue Devils men's basketball players
KK Borac Čačak players
Point guards
People from Woodland Hills, Los Angeles
USC Trojans men's basketball players
21st-century African-American sportspeople